Warren O. Billhartz (January 3, 1927 – August 21, 2006) was an American lawyer and politician.

Billhartz was born in Centralia, Illinois and went to the New Baden, Illinois public schools. He served in the United States Merchant Marine during World War II. Billhartz graduated from Illinois College and Washington University in St. Louis School of Law. Billhartz was admitted to the Illinois and Missouri bar associations and practiced law in Belleville, Illinois. He was also involved with the banking and loan business. He was an assistant Illinois Attorney General and was involved with the Republican Party. Billhartz served on the Clinton Board of School Trustees and was the first president of the school board.  Billhartz served in the Illinois House of Representatives from 1955 to 1961. He lived in Collinsville, Illinois. Billhartz died in St. Louis, Missouri

Notes

External links

1927 births
2006 deaths
People from Centralia, Illinois
Military personnel from Illinois
United States Merchant Mariners
United States Merchant Mariners of World War II
Illinois College alumni
Illinois lawyers
Missouri lawyers
Businesspeople from Illinois
School board members in Illinois
Republican Party members of the Illinois House of Representatives
20th-century American politicians
20th-century American businesspeople
20th-century American lawyers
Washington University School of Law alumni